The following are the national records in track cycling in Greece maintained by the Hellenic Cycling Federation.

Men

Women

References

External links
 EOP web site

Greece
Records
Track cycling
track cycling